John Bridges may refer to:

 John Bridges (bishop) (1536–1618), Bishop of Oxford
 John Bridges (Parliamentarian) (1610–?), English politician who sat in the House of Commons in 1654 and 1656
 John Bridges (topographer) (1666–1724), English lawyer, antiquarian and topographer
 John Bridges (archer) (1852–1925), British archer who competed at the 1908 Summer Olympics
 John Bridges (software developer), author of GLPro, GRASP, and PCPaint
 John Keith Bridges (born 1952), rugby league player for Featherstone Rovers, England and Great Britain
 John Bridges (MP) (died 1537), MP for Canterbury
 John E. Bridges, Chelan County Superior Court Judge in Washington state

See also
John Brydges (disambiguation)